The Beach Soccer Intercontinental Cup is an international beach soccer tournament which is held in Dubai, the United Arab Emirates every November as the finale of the competitive international beach soccer season. The invitation-only tournament has been held annually since the inaugural edition in 2011.

The Intercontinental Cup is second only to the FIFA Beach Soccer World Cup as the largest and most prestigious event on the international beach soccer circuit, featuring an exclusive assembly of the world's very best national teams from each continent. Since the World Cup is a biannual competition, this event is now the most important annual international beach soccer tournament.

The competition bares many similarities to the FIFA Confederations Cup in association football, with each of the six confederations of FIFA (UEFA, CONMEBOL, CONCACAF, CAF, AFC, OFC) represented by at least one nation, however is not so strict on entry requirements – those countries competing do not necessarily have to be regional champions, but nevertheless will still be one of the best performing nations from their confederation's most recent regional championship. The tournament hosts and reigning World Cup champions also take part, taking the total number of participants to eight.

Samsung was the lead sponsor and presenting partner of the tournament from its inception until 2016. Huawei became new lead sponsors for 2017–18. The Dubai Sports Council (DSC) and Beach Soccer Worldwide (BSWW) organise the competition.

Russia and Iran are the most successful teams, having won four tournaments each. Iran is also the current champions.

Organisation

Foundation

Dubai first hosted a beach soccer event in 2000 and since 2006, the city began holding annual events, culminating with the hosting of beach soccer's premier event in 2009, the FIFA Beach Soccer World Cup. During 2009, Emirates and FIFA struck an agreement to have the former sponsor and fund football tournaments worldwide. In connection to this deal, Dubai was offered to host an event in either youth football, women's football or beach soccer. DSC decided on beach soccer following the success and popularity of the World Cup.

BSWW were also keen on returning beach soccer to Dubai, with Vice-president Joan Cusco claiming Dubai as beach soccer's "second most important city in this sport" save for Rio de Janeiro. After using the time in 2010 to consider how to take beach soccer forward in the city following the World Cup success, an agreement was made between BSWW and DSC in 2011 to host the new Intercontinental Cup.

It was desired by BSWW to have the tournament respect the legacy and be a celebration of the 2009 Dubai World Cup. Therefore, it was believed the idea of the competition, featuring the world's very best teams from each continent, modelled notably similarly to association football's secondary international event, the FIFA Confederations Cup, would be best suited to achieve these goals. After a successful maiden event in 2011, BSWW and DSC decided to make the tournament an annual occurrence, signing a 5-year contract in 2012. In 2017, at the end of the 5-year deal, the two parties extended the existing contract to 2020.

During this time, the championship's reputation has grown quickly because of the high level of elite competition only comparable to the World Cup and, combined with the yearly presence of the championship, it has become beach soccer's most prestigious annual event (considering the fact that the World Cup is now a biannual event).

Venues

Despite always taking place in Dubai to date, the tournament has been staged in multiple different parts of the city.
2011: The Walk, Jumeirah Beach Residence
2012: Festival City
2013–16: Dubai International Marine Club
2017: Business Bay
2018–19: Kite Beach

Format
The Intercontinental Cup is a 5-day event. The eight teams are split into two groups of four. The tournament starts with the group stage, played in a round robin format, taking place during days one through three. The winners and runners-up from each group advanced to the knockout stage, in which the teams then compete in single-elimination matches, beginning with the semi-finals and ending with the final on days four and five respectively. A third-place play-off is also contested by the losing semi-finalists on day five. The third and fourth placed nations from each group play in a series of consolation matches to decide fifth through eighth place however these matches have only occurred since 2013.

Results
Source:

Medals (2011-2022)

Successful teams

Success by confederation

Awards

Total Awards (2011-2022)

Summary (2011-2022)

Points: W = 3 points / WE = 2 points / WP = 1 points / L = 0 points

Performance timeline & Appearances
Key

 — Champions
 — Runners-up
 — Third place
 — Fourth place
5th–8th — Fifth to eighth place

 — Did not participate
 — Hosts
 — Reigning world champions
Apps — Appearances

All-time top goalscorers
As of 2022

The following table shows the all-time top 20 goalscorers.

References

External links
Emirates Intercontinental Beach Soccer Cup on Beach Soccer Worldwide 
Intercontinental Cup on Beach Soccer Russia 

 
Beach soccer competitions
Sports competitions in Dubai